Arietta is a town in Hamilton County, New York, United States. The population was 304 at the 2010 census. The town was named after the mother of one of the first settlers, Rensselaer Van Rennslaer.

History 
The town was first settled around 1827 at Piseco Lake.

The town of Arietta was formed in 1836, from the town of Lake Pleasant. In 1837, part of Arietta was used to form part of the town of Long Lake. Another part of Arietta was added to Long Lake in 1861.

Geography

The town of Arietta is inside the Adirondack Park.

The southern town line is the border of Fulton County.

The East Canada Creek flows southward from the area around Powley to the Mohawk River. The West Branch of the Sacandaga River flows from Piseco Lake, via the Piseco Outlet, to the east.

New York State Route 8, an east-west highway, intersects New York State Route 10, a north-south highway, south of Piseco Lake.

Adjacent towns and areas 
The western border of Arietta is the town of Morehouse. To the east are the towns of Lake Pleasant, Wells, and Benson. The town of Long Lake is at the northern boundary. The southern border is formed by the towns of Stratford and Caroga in Fulton County.

Demographics

As of the census of 2000, there were 293 people, 126 households, and 86 families residing in the town.  The population density was 0.9 people per square mile (0.4/km2).  There were 788 housing units at an average density of 2.5 per square mile (1.0/km2).  The racial makeup of the town was 100.00% White.

There were 126 households, out of which 23.8% had children under the age of 18 living with them, 54.8% were married couples living together, 10.3% had a female householder with no husband present, and 31.0% were non-families. 28.6% of all households were made up of individuals, and 15.1% had someone living alone who was 65 years of age or older.  The average household size was 2.33 and the average family size was 2.82.

In the town, the population was spread out, with 21.5% under the age of 18, 6.8% from 18 to 24, 22.5% from 25 to 44, 30.7% from 45 to 64, and 18.4% who were 65 years of age or older.  The median age was 44 years. For every 100 females, there were 99.3 males.  For every 100 females age 18 and over, there were 91.7 males.

The median income for a household in the town was $36,375, and the median income for a family was $42,917. Males had a median income of $29,286 versus $22,417 for females. The per capita income for the town was $25,378.  None of the families and 2.8% of the population were living below the poverty line.

Communities and locations in Arietta

Inhabited locations 
Arietta – The hamlet of Arietta is located on NY-10 in the southern part of the town.
Avery's Place (or Avery Place) – A hamlet on NY-10 north of Arietta and south of Higgins Bay.
Clockmill Corners – A location by the western town line, on Powley Road.
Higgins Bay – This hamlet is on the southern shore of Piseco Lake on NY-8. The community is located on a small bay in the lake, also called Higgins Bay. It is north of the junction of Routes NY-8 and NY-10.
Kenwells – A location on the western town line in the northern part of the town.
Piseco – A hamlet located by Piseco Lake, which was originally proposed as the county seat.
Piseco Airport (K09) – A small general aviation airport north of Piseco.
Powley Place – A deserted hamlet by the western town line, on Powley Road.
Rudestone – A hamlet on Old Piseco Road between Piseco Lake and Oxbow Lake.
Shaker Place – A location west of NY-10 and south of Higgins Bay.

Geographical features 
Big Bay – A wide section of the Piseco Outlet south of NY-8.
Big Goldmine Hill – An elevation located northwest of the hamlet of Arietta.
Big Marsh Mountain – An elevation located west of the hamlet of Higgins Bay.
Bluff Point Hill – An elevation located north-northwest of the hamlet of Piseco.
Bradley Mountain – An elevation located north-northwest of the hamlet of Piseco.
Brown Lake – A small lake located east of Arietta.
Buck Mountain – An elevation located north-northwest of the hamlet of Piseco.
Cedar Lake – A lake located northwest of Sled Harbor. 
Cellar Mountain – An elevation located north-northwest of the hamlet of Piseco.
Christian Lake Mountain – An elevation located northwest of the hamlet of Arietta.
Chub Lake Mountain – An elevation located north of the hamlet of Arietta.
Dead Horse Mountain – An elevation located northwest of the hamlet of Arietta.
Eagle Bluff – An elevation located northwest of the hamlet of Higgins Bay.
East Notch Mountain – An elevation located northwest of the hamlet of Arietta.
Ely Mountain – An elevation located north of the hamlet of Arietta.
Estelle Mountain – An elevation located north-northwest of the hamlet of Piseco.
Fall Lake – A lake located north of Piseco.
Ferris Lake – A lake east of Powleys Place.
G Lake – A lake located west of Higgins Bay.
G Lake Mountain – An elevation located west of the hamlet of Higgins Bay.
Good Luck Mountain – An elevation located west of the hamlet of Arietta.
Good Luck Mountain – An elevation located north of the hamlet of Piseco.
Green Top – An elevation located north-northwest of the hamlet of Piseco.
Higgins Bay – A bay on the east side of Piseco Lake, west of NY-8.
Irondequoit Bay – The southern end of Piseco Lake.
Irondequoit Mountain – An elevation located west of the hamlet of Higgins Bay.
Iron Lake – A lake located east of Powley Place.
Jockeybush Lake – A lake located east of Powley Place.
Kitty Cobble – An elevation located northwest of the hamlet of Piseco.
Lamphere Ridge – An elevation located north of the hamlet of Piseco.
Little Goldmine Hill – An elevation located northwest of the hamlet of Arietta.
Little Moose Mountain – An elevation located north-northwest of the hamlet of Piseco.
Little Moose Pond – A lake located north of Piseco.
Lower Sargent Pond – A lake located east of Raquette Lake.
Manbury Mountain – An elevation located north-northwest of the hamlet of Piseco.
Matts Mountain – An elevation located north-northwest of the hamlet of Arietta.
Mud Lake – A lake located east of West Lake.
Mud Lake Mountain – An elevation located northwest of the hamlet of Arietta.
Noisy Ridge – An elevation located north of the hamlet of Piseco.
North Branch Mountain – An elevation located southeast of the hamlet of Higgins Bay.
Otter Lake – A small lake located northwest of Piseco.
Oxbow Lake – A small lake northeast of Piseco Lake, partly in the Town of Lake Pleasant.
Oxbow Mountain – An elevation located southeast of the hamlet of Piseco.
Panther Mountain – An elevation located west-northwest of the hamlet of Higgins Bay.
Pillsbury Lake – A lake located northwest of Sled Harbor.
Pillsbury Mountain – An elevation located north of the hamlet of Piseco.
Pine Mountain – An elevation located north-northwest of the hamlet of Arietta.
Piseco Lake – A large lake west of NY-8.
Piseco Mountain – An elevation located northwest of the hamlet of Higgins Bay.
Piseco Outlet – The stream which flows from the southern end of Piseco Lake to the West Branch of the Sacandaga River.
Rock Lake – A lake located southeast of Clockmill Corners.
Rooster Hill – An elevation located south of the hamlet of Arietta.
Sampson Lake – A lake located south of Cedar Lake.
Sherman Mountain – An elevation located north of the hamlet of Arietta.
South Lake – A lake located southwest of Cedar Lake.
Spruce Lake – A lake located northwest of Piseco.
Spy Lake – A lake east of Piseco Lake and east of NY-8.
Squirrel Top – An elevation located north-northwest of the hamlet of Piseco.
Stacy Mountain – An elevation located northwest of the hamlet of Higgins Bay.
State Brook Mountain – An elevation located northwest of the hamlet of Arietta.
Sugarbush Mountain – An elevation located northwest of the hamlet of Arietta.
T Lake Mountain – An elevation located northwest of the hamlet of Higgins Bay.
Three Sisters Mountain – An elevation located north of the hamlet of Arietta.
Tomany Mountain – An elevation located northwest of the hamlet of Arietta.
Trout Lake – A lake located south of Avery Place.
Trout Lake Mountain – An elevation located north-northwest of the hamlet of Arietta.
Twin Lakes Mountain – An elevation located northwest of the hamlet of Higgins Bay.
Upper Sargent Pond – A lake located east of Raquette Lake.
Wakely Mountain – An elevation located north-northwest of the hamlet of Piseco.
West Creek Mountain – An elevation located northwest of the hamlet of Arietta.
West Lake – a lake located north of South Lake and west of Mud Lake.
West Notch Mountain – An elevation located northwest of the hamlet of Arietta.
Whitney Lake – A lake located south of Cedar Lake.
Willis Mountain – An elevation located north-northeast of the hamlet of Piseco.
Wilson Ridge – An elevation located north-northwest of the hamlet of Piseco.

References

External links
 Town of Arietta official website
 Piseco Airport information
 Arietta history

Populated places established in 1827
Towns in Hamilton County, New York
1827 establishments in New York (state)